The 1971 Limerick Senior Hurling Championship was the 77th staging of the Limerick Senior Hurling Championship since its establishment by the Limerick County Board in 1887.

Patrickswell were the defending champions.

On 12 December 1971, Claughaun won the championship after a 6-06 to 2-13 defeat of South Liberties in the final. It was their ninth championship title overall and their first championship title in three years.

Results

Final

References

Limerick Senior Hurling Championship
Limerick Senior Hurling Championship